Fiona Clark (born 1954) is a New Zealand social documentary photographer, one of the first photographers to document New Zealand's LGBT scene. In the 1970s and 1980s she photographed Karangahape Road, and the clubs Mojo's and Las Vegas Club.

Early life and education 

Clark was born in Inglewood, New Zealand in 1954 and attended Inglewood High School. Clark has said that her time at Inglewood High School taught her about survival as a young woman, citing the violence and the two murders that occurred there.

Her family were farmers, but she has said they were not "typical farmers", her brothers were arrested for protesting against the Vietnam War and encouraged her and her siblings to attend university.

She moved to Auckland at the age of 16 to attend the Elam School of Fine Arts. Clark was initially enrolled in performing arts, but moved into the photography department in her third year in 1974. In 1975 Clark moved to Tikorangi, where she still lives.

Career 
Clark's work is predominantly social documentary photography. She was one of the first photographers to cover New Zealand's LGBT scene, notably documenting the queer community in the 1970s and 1980s, K Road, and the clubs Mojo's and Las Vegas Club. Clark also documented the emerging punk subculture in New Zealand.

In 1975 her work faced censorship and public outcry, with two of her photographs being removed from The Active Eye exhibition. As part of this outcry, the Auckland City Gallery had to close briefly because of the criticisms, 200 people complained to the Auckland Council over the photographs, and a private complaint was made to the police alleging public indecency. Some of the photographs went missing in 1976 from the Auckland City Gallery before the police could review them - in 2017 Clark said that still does not know what happened to them.

This outcry extended to her wider work also, with some art dealers saying that they would refuse to handle her photography and Kodak acknowledging that they would not develop her photographs that were considered obscene. 

In 2002, in reflection of the exhibition The Active Eye, Clark published the book Go Girl and exhibited a collection of photographs at the Govett-Brewster Art Gallery.

In 2021 a documentary about Clark was made by Lula Cucchiara about Clark's work.

Personal life 
Clark is a lesbian. In an interview she said:I used to have a saying on my wall: ‘Once I was a tomboy and now I’m a full-grown lesbian.’ One day I crossed out the last half and wrote ‘but now I’m queer’. Even that label will probably change.Clark was friends with, and used to photograph often, Carmen Rupe who called her "my photographer Fiona."  Rupe used some of these photos for her christmas and business cards.

In 1977 Clark, aged 23, was involved in a motorcycle crash which broke her jaw and shattered many bones in her face, leaving her with an inverted eye.

Exhibitions 

 1975, The Active Eye, Manawatu Art Gallery, Palmerston North
 1982, Body Building, Robert McDougall Art Gallery
 2002, Go Girl, Govett-Brewster Gallery
 2009, Amy Bock, South Otago Museum, Otago
 2016, Niccole Duval, Michael Lett
 2016, For Fantastic Carmen, Artspace NZ, Auckland
 2016, For Pink Pussycat Club, Artspace NZ, Auckland
 2016, SIART Biennale, Museo National de Arte La Paz, Bolivia
 2016–7, All Lines Converge, Govett-Brewster Art Gallery (with L. Budd, and et al.)
 2017, Te iwi o te wahi kore, Dowse Art Museum, Lower Hutt

Awards 
1980: Queen Elizabeth II Arts Council grant to photograph the "Mr Olympia" body building contest in Sydney.

Films
 Fiona Clark: Unafraid (2021) – documentary, directed by Lula Cucchiara

References

External links 

Living people
1954 births
People from Inglewood, New Zealand
People from Auckland
Elam Art School alumni
New Zealand women photographers
People educated at Inglewood High School, New Zealand